Melanie Marti (born 3 June 1986) is a Swiss former artistic gymnast. She competed at the 2004 Summer Olympics.

References

1986 births
Living people
Swiss female artistic gymnasts
Gymnasts at the 2004 Summer Olympics
Olympic gymnasts of Switzerland
People from Glarus